Luisa Haydee Cervera Cevedon (born 4 July 1964 in Lima) is a former Peruvian volleyball player. She received a silver medal at the 1988 Olympic games in Seoul, after playing the Soviet Union in the final. She also participated at the 1984 Olympic Games in Los Angeles, where Peru reached the semi finals and lost for United States, and finally finished 4th. She is married with Umberto Chiarello, an Italian personal trainer, and they have two children: Melisa and Marco.

References

External links
 
 

1964 births
 Living people
 Olympic volleyball players of Peru
 Volleyball players at the 1984 Summer Olympics
 Volleyball players at the 1988 Summer Olympics
 Olympic silver medalists for Peru
 Peruvian women's volleyball players
 Olympic medalists in volleyball
 Medalists at the 1988 Summer Olympics
Pan American Games medalists in volleyball
Pan American Games silver medalists for Peru
Volleyball players at the 1987 Pan American Games
Medalists at the 1987 Pan American Games
20th-century Peruvian women